1. Wiener Neustädter Sportclub is an Austrian association football club based in Wiener Neustadt.

History

FC Magna Wiener Neustadt obtained the right to play in the First League due to the collapse of SC Schwanenstadt caused by financial problems. SC Schwanenstadt's playing licence was taken over by Magna, who took their place in the First League. On 19 May, Austrian-Canadian business man Frank Stronach, the founder of Magna International, was elected president of the club.

The club played its first ever league game on 12 July 2008 against relegated side FC Wacker Innsbruck and lost 0–3. The remaining season was a lot more successful, culminating in the Austrian First League championship and promotion to the Austrian Bundesliga.

In late 2008 1. Wiener Neustädter SC decided to merge with FC Magna. In order to acknowledge the past of 1. SC, FC Magna was renamed SC Magna Wiener Neustadt, effective from 1 July 2009. In 2010 Magna decided to cooperate with SK Sturm Graz.

Current squad

Former players

  Peter Wurz

Manager history

 Helmut Kraft (2008–2009)
  Peter Schöttel (2009–2011)
  Peter Stöger (2011–2012)
  Heimo Pfeifenberger (2012–2014)
  Helgi Kolviðsson (2014–2015)
  Günter Kreissl (2015–2016)
  René Wagner (2016–2017)
 Roman Mählich (2017– 2018)
 Gerhard Fellner (2018-2019)
 Sargon Duran (2019 caretaker)
 Thomas Flögl (2019-2020)
 Jürgen Burgemeister (2020-2021)
 Oliver Oberhammer (2021)
 Zeljko Ristic (2021-)

References

External links

Club website 

 
Association football clubs established in 1908
Wiener Neustadt
Sport in Lower Austria
Wiener Neustadt
1908 establishments in Austria